The 2020 United States Senate election in Rhode Island was held on November 3, 2020, to elect a member of the United States Senate to represent the State of Rhode Island, concurrently with the 2020 U.S. presidential election, as well as other elections to the United States Senate, elections to the United States House of Representatives and various state and local elections. Incumbent Democratic Senator Jack Reed was challenged by Republican nominee Allen Waters. Waters was later disavowed by the state Republican Party after charges of domestic assault in 2019 became public.

Reed easily won a fifth term in office with 66.5% of the vote and a 33.1% margin. Despite Reed's clear landslide victory, this was actually Reed's worst Senate re-election performance, and the first time since 1996 in which he failed to receive at least 70% of the vote. Nevertheless, Reed outperformed Democratic presidential nominee Joe Biden by 7.2% in the concurrent presidential election, the largest overperformance by any Democratic Senate candidate in 2020.

Democratic primary

Candidates

Nominee
Jack Reed, incumbent U.S. Senator

Primary results

Republican primary

Candidates

Nominee
Allen R. Waters, investment consultant

Primary results

Independents

Disqualified
 Lenine Camacho

General election

Predictions

Results 

Municipalities that flipped from Democratic to Republican
Burrillville
Foster
Glocester
West Greenwich

See also
 2020 Rhode Island elections

References

External links
 
 
  (State affiliate of the U.S. League of Women Voters)
 

Official campaign websites
 Jack Reed (D) for Senate
 Allen Waters (R) for Senate

2020
Rhode Island
United States Senate